The Battle of Pollilur (a.k.a. Pullalur), also known as the Battle of Polilore or Battle of Perambakam, took place on 10 September 1780 at Pollilur near Conjeevaram, the city of Kanchipuram in present-day Tamil Nadu state, India, as part of the Second Anglo-Mysore War. It was fought between an army commanded by Tipu Sultan of the Kingdom of Mysore, and a British East India Company force led by William Baillie. The EIC force suffered a high number of casualties before surrendering. It was the worst loss the East India Company suffered on the subcontinent until Chillianwala. Benoît de Boigne, a French officer in the service of 6th Regiment of Madras Native Infantry, wrote, "There is not in India an example of a similar defeat".

Background

Tipu prevented Baillie from joining another EIC force, consisting of two companies of European infantry, two batteries of artillery, and five battalions of native infantry from Guntur led by Hector Munro at Conjeevaram, while Tipu's father Hyder Ali continued the siege at Arcot.

Battle

Baillie's men, suffering desertions and uncoordinated leadership, formed a defensive square on a patch of high ground, with William Baillie leading a final stand. Cut off from both Conjeevaram and the stronghold of Fort St. George in Madras where a larger EIC force remained encamped, Baillie's men were caught in a double envelopment movement, encircled and routed. Of the men under Baillie's command, only 50 European officers and 150 men were taken prisoner after the "general massacre". Baillie was taken to Seringapatam (Srirangapatnam near Mysore in the present-day Karnataka state). Pullalur was also the site where the king of Badami Chalukya, Pulakesin II fought the Pallava king, Mahendravarman I, in the 7th century.

Aftermath

Baillie and many of his officers were captured and taken to the Mysore capital at Seringapatam. After British reinforcements from Calcutta arrived, Eyre Coote was able to stabilise the situation and counter-attack.
A second battle was fought a year later in the same area.

Rockets
The Mysore rockets used during the battle were much more advanced than the British East India Company had previously seen, chiefly because of the use of iron tubes for holding the propellant; this enabled higher thrust and longer range for the missile (up to 2 km range). At Pollilur, Mysore rockets restricted the British vanguard movement, skimming along the surface, lacerating troops, and in one specific instance, shattering an Ensign’s leg. After Tipu Sultan's eventual defeat in the Fourth Anglo-Mysore War and the capture of the Mysore iron rockets, they were influential in British rocket development, inspiring the Congreve rocket, which was soon put into use in the Napoleonic Wars.

Gallery

See also
Tipu Sultan
Hyder Ali
Mughal weapons

References

External links
"Battle of Pollilur (1780)" - A detailed historical analysis (and its importance in world history)
 Tipu Sultan website
 Wilson, W. J. History of the Madras Army, Volume 2

Pollilur 1780
Pollilur 1780
History of Tamil Nadu
1780 in India